The 2009 Recopa Sul-Brasileira was the 3rd staging of this Brazilian football knockout competition. All matches of the competition were played at Estádio Municipal Domenico Paolo Metidieri, Votorantim, São Paulo. Four clubs participated of the competition: Porto Alegre, of Rio Grande do Sul (runner-up of Copa Arthur Dellagrave), Serrano Centro-Sul of Paraná (champion of Campeonato Paranense Second Level), Votoraty of São Paulo (champion of Copa Paulista de Futebol), and Joinville of Santa Catarina (champion of Copa Santa Catarina).

Prize money
The winner of the competition was awarded a prize money amount of R$30,000, and the runner-up was awarded a prize money amount of R$10,000.

Competition format
The competition is a one legged knockout tournament played in two stages, semifinals and the final.

Competition stages

Semifinals

Final

Champion

Top goalscorers

References

External links
 Recopa Sul-Brasileira 2009 at RSSSF

2009 Recopa Sul-Brasileira
2009 Brazilian football competitions
2009 domestic association football cups